Agonum cupripenne is a species of ground beetle from Platyninae family that can be found in the United States and Canada. They are green coloured and have a purple head.

References

External links
Agonum cupripenne on Bug Guide
Agonum cupripenne on Encyclopedia of Life

Beetles described in 1823
Beetles of North America
cupripenne